Hero Motors Company (HMC) is an Indian multinational business conglomerate controlled by Pankaj M Munjal. The HMC family is made up of organisations such as Hero Cycles, Avocet Sports (UK), BSH (Sri Lanka), Firefox, Spur, HGD, Hero Motors, Munjal Hospitality, Munjal Kiriu, ZF Hero and OMA.

Plants
Hero Cycles, Ludhiana, Punjab
Hero Cycles, Ghaziabad, Uttar Pradesh
Hero Cycles, Bihta, Bihar
BSH Ventures Pvt. Ltd., Sri Lanka
ZF HERO Chassis Systems, Pune, Maharashtra
ZF HERO Chassis Systems, Chennai, Tamil Nadu
Munjal Kiriu, Manesar, Haryana
Munjal Kiriu, Ahmedabad, Gujarat

See also
 Hero MotoCorp

References

External links
 HMC
 Hero Cycles

Cycle manufacturers of India
Companies based in Punjab, India
Economy of Ludhiana
Vehicle manufacturing companies established in 1956
Indian companies established in 1957
Indian brands
Science and technology in Ludhiana
Hero Group
1957 establishments in East Punjab